Kerry Argent (born 1960) is an Australian illustrator of children's books.

Life
Argent was born in Angaston in South Australia. She came to notice when she was part of the new wave of children's books published when Bob Hawke was the Prime Minister. After studying commercial art at TAFE, Argent went on to study graphic design at the South Australian School of Design. As part of her graduate course she illustrated a counting book written by her partner, artist and author Rod Trinca, called One Woolly Wombat. This book inspired a revival of Australian children's picture book literature and helped provide the publisher Omnibus Books with the finance needed to publish its second book: Possum Magic by Mem Fox. One Woolly Wombat has been the recipient of both international and national awards and was selected as the "Best Children's Book" in 1985, when it won a Whitley Award by the Royal Zoological Society of New South Wales. It is now considered a modern-day classic of Australian children's literature. It continues to sell, 35 years after its first release.

Argent has illustrated several books by Australian children's writers Mem Fox, Thelma Catterwell and Margaret Wild. Her illustrations for Sofie Laguna's Too Loud Lily gained the Children's Book Council of Australia's Book of the Year award for early childhood in 2003.

In 2018 Dr Belle Alderman who is an Emeritus Professor of Children's Literature, and the director of the National Centre for Australian Children's Literature organised an exhibition at the University of Canberra of children's book illustrations. Artists included May Gibbs, Kylie Dunstan, Vivienne Goodman, Graeme Base, Bob Graham, Shaun Tan and Argent.

Works

References

1960 births
Living people
Australian children's book illustrators
People from Angaston, South Australia
Australian women illustrators